The Ilagâ (Hiligaynon for rat) is a Christian extremist paramilitary group based in southern Philippines. The group is predominantly composed of Visayans (mostly Hiligaynon-speakers), embracing a form of Folk Catholicism that utilizes amulets and violence. 

The group complemented the Philippine Constabulary as a militia force during the 1970s in southern Mindanao while fighting against Moro guerrillas during the Moro insurgency in the Philippines.

From 1970 to 1971 Ilaga launched a series of 21 massacres that left 518 people dead, 184 injured, and 243 houses burned down. The group committed one of its bloodiest acts with the Manili massacre on June 19, 1971, when the group killed 70–79 Moro civilians (women, children and elders) inside a mosque.

Background

The Mindanao region is rich in natural resources, including large quantities of mineral reserves. The American colonial government and subsequently the Philippine government pursued a policy of migration by resettling significant numbers of Christian Filipino settlers from the Visayas and Luzon onto tracts of land in Mindanao, beginning in the 1920s. This policy allowed Christian Filipinos to outnumber both the Moro and Lumad populations by the 1970s, which was a contributing factor in aggravating grievances between the Moro and Filipino Christian settlers as disputes over land increased. Another grievance by the Moro people is the extraction of Mindanao's natural resources by the central government whilst many Moros continued to live in poverty.

The Ilaga originated as an anti-ranchero resistance collective in Upi led by Commander Toothpick (Feliciano Luces), formed by Hiligaynon-speakers and Teduray natives specifically to defend against "a political clan of known Marcos cronies". The group gained legendary status and its members hailed as folk heroes after having prevailed over the security personnel of said "oppressive landed family" during an armed encounter, using nothing but mêlée weapons and homemade firearms. State security forces would eventually encourage Hiligaynon-speaking settlers who had emigrated to Mindanao to grow the militia, but hereafter coopted for a completely different purpose. There is anecdotal evidence that the Ilaga often committed human rights abuses by targeting the Moro and Lumad peoples, as well as attempting to seize additional territory. The end result of Ilaga extremism is the lingering animosity between Moro and Christian communities. Mistrust and a cycle of violence are still felt today due to the creation of the Ilaga.

History

From March 1970 to January 1972, the Ilaga committed 22 massacres resulting in the deaths of hundreds of Muslim civilians (mostly women, children and elders). The group is guilty of "mutilat[ing] bodies of victims" and "marking bodies with a cross." The group also burned down and looted many houses and properties.

Manili massacre

Violence attributed to the Ilaga reached its climax on June 19, 1971 with the Manili massacre of 70-79 Moro Maguindanaon Civilians (women, children and elders) in a mosque in Manili, Carmen, North Cotabato. The Muslim residents of the town had gathered in their mosque to participate in a supposed peace talk with Christian groups when a group of armed men dressed in uniforms similar to those worn by members of the Philippine Constabulary opened fire on them.

1971 Battle of Lanao del Norte

Following the massacre at Manili, many Maranao Muslims civilians fled to take shelter in the Lanao del Norte. Some Muslims formed small militant groups to counter the Ilaga. One such group was called the "Barracudas" and in September 1971, the Barracudas clashed with the Ilagas resulting in the deaths of hundreds of people on both sides of the conflict. The Ilagas also clashed with the Philippine Constabulary. The skirmishes continued until October, and over 60 Muslim houses were torched by the Ilaga.

Murder of Tullio Favali

Tullio Favali was a member of the Pontifical Institute for Foreign Missions (PIME), an all-male international group of priests who are dedicated to evangelization in underdeveloped and non-Christian nations. Favali was assigned to do missions work in the Philippines, particularly in provinces in Mindanao. He arrived in the Philippines in 1983, and was ordained as the parish priest of La Esperanza in Tulunan, North Cotabato.

On April 11, 1985, Favali was called by townspeople for help after the Manero brothers shot the town's tailor. When the Manero brothers saw him arrive and enter a house, Norberto Jr. dragged his motorcycle and set it on fire. When Favali hurried out after seeing the fire, Edilberto threatened the priest before shooting the him pointblank in the head, he then trampled on the fallen priest's body and fired again. This caused the priest's skull to crack open, and Norberto Jr. picked the brains and displayed them to the horrified witnesses. The brothers, along with a few other gang members, stood by laughing and heckling.

The Manero brothers and five others were found guilty of murder, and sentenced to life imprisonment. The court also found Norberto Jr. guilty of arson.

Noeberto Manero, Jr., however, would later be pardoned.

Post-2008 resurgence
Increased tensions in the Philippines since 2008 have since seen the re-emergence of the armed vigilante group calling themselves the Bag-ong Ilaga (Visayan: New Ilaga). Since 2008, violence flared up with the Moro Islamic Liberation Front and the Armed Forces of the Philippines after the Supreme Court of the Philippines overruled the proposed treaty for an Autonomous Region in Muslim Mindanao.

In November 2008, the Ilaga killed five unarmed Muslim civilians in an ambush in Lanao del Norte.

In 2012, two members of the group committed robbery and also murdered two civilians. They were then arrested.

See also 

 Moro insurgency in the Philippines
 Bangsamoro

References

External links
  “Ilaga revival to make things worse – Piñol” Philippine Daily Inquirer, retrieved September 14, 2008

Moro conflict
Paramilitary organizations based in the Philippines
Hiligaynon people
Folk Catholicism
Christian terrorism in Asia
Christian fascists
Catholicism and far-right politics
Sedevacantists
Persecution of Muslims
Violence against Muslims